Bradley Efron (born May 24, 1938) is an American statistician. Efron has been president of the American Statistical Association (2004) and of the Institute of Mathematical Statistics (1987–1988). He is a past editor (for theory and methods) of the Journal of the American Statistical Association, and he is the founding editor of the Annals of Applied Statistics. Efron is also the recipient of many awards (see below).

Efron is especially known for proposing the bootstrap resampling technique, which has had a major impact in the field of statistics and virtually every area of statistical application. The bootstrap was one of the first computer-intensive statistical techniques, replacing traditional algebraic derivations with data-based computer simulations.

Life and career
Efron was born in St. Paul, Minnesota in May 1938, the son of Russian Jewish immigrants Esther and Miles Efron. He attended the California Institute of Technology, graduating in Mathematics in 1960. He arrived at Stanford in fall of 1960, earning his Ph.D., under the direction of Rupert Miller and Herbert Solomon, in the Department of Statistics.  While at Stanford, he was suspended for six months for his involvement with the Stanford Chaparral'''s parody of Playboy magazine.

He is currently a Professor of Statistics and Biostatistics at Stanford. At Stanford he has been the Chair of the Department of Statistics, Associate Dean of the School of Humanities and Sciences, Chairman of the University Advisory Board, Chair of the Faculty Senate, and Co-director of the undergraduate-level Mathematical & Computational Science Program.

Efron holds the Max H. Stein endowed chair as Professor of Humanities and Sciences at Stanford.

He has made many important contributions to many areas of statistics. Efron's work has spanned both theoretical and applied topics, including empirical Bayes analysis (with Carl Morris), applications of differential geometry to statistical inference, the analysis of survival data, and inference for microarray gene expression data. He is the author of a classic monograph, The Jackknife, the Bootstrap and Other Resampling Plans (1982) and has also co-authored (with Robert Tibshirani) the text An Introduction to the Bootstrap (1994).

He created a set of intransitive dice called Efron's dice.

Awards
He has been given many honors, including a MacArthur Prize Fellowship, membership in the National Academy of Sciences and the American Academy of Arts and Sciences, fellowship in the Institute of Mathematical Statistics (IMS) and the American Statistical Association (ASA), the Lester R. Ford Award, the Wilks Medal, the Parzen Prize, and the Rao Prize, Fisher, Rietz, and Wald lecturer.

In 2005, he was awarded the National Medal of Science, the highest scientific honor by the United States, for his exceptional work in the field of Statistics (especially for his inventing of the bootstrapping methodology). He was presented with the award on May 29, 2007.

In 2014, he was awarded the Guy Medal in Gold.

He has won the BBVA Foundation Frontiers of Knowledge Award in the Basic Sciences category jointly with David Cox, for the development of “pioneering and hugely influential” statistical methods that have proved indispensable for obtaining reliable results in a vast spectrum of disciplines from medicine to astrophysics, genomics, and particle physics.

He received the International Prize in Statistics at the 2019 World Statistics Congress.

Selected publications

 
 
 Efron, B. (1979). "Computers and the theory of statistics: thinking the unthinkable". SIAM Review.
 
 Efron, B. (1982). "The jackknife, the bootstrap, and other resampling plans". Society of Industrial and Applied Mathematics CBMS-NSF Monographs, 38.
 Diaconis, P. & Efron, B. (1983). "Computer-intensive methods in statistics". Scientific American, May, 116-130.
 Efron, B. (1983). "Estimating the error rate of a prediction rule: improvement on cross-validation". Journal of the American Statistical Association Efron, B. (1985). "Bootstrap confidence intervals for a class of parametric problems." Biometrika.
 Efron, B. (1987). "Better bootstrap confidence intervals". Journal of the American Statistical Association Efron, B. (1990). "More efficient bootstrap computations". Journal of the American Statistical Association Efron, B. (1991). "Regression percentiles using asymmetric squared error loss". Statistica sinica.
 Efron, B. (1992). "Jackknife-after-bootstrap standards errors and influence functions". in Journal of the Royal Statistical Society''
 Efron, B., & Tibshirani, R. J. (1993). "An introduction to the bootstrap". New York: Chapman & Hall, software.

See also

 Clinical trials
 Empirical Bayesian
 Fisher, Ronald
 Least-angle regression
 Fisher information
 Hinkley, David V.
 Likelihood function
 Observed information
 Robbins, Herbert
 Sequential analysis
 Stein, Charles

References

External links
 Personal home page: https://efron.ckirby.su.domains
 Statistical Science Silver Anniversary issue on Bootstrap, including interview with Efron
 

1938 births
American statisticians
American bioinformaticians
Biostatisticians
Fellows of the American Statistical Association
Living people
National Medal of Science laureates
MacArthur Fellows
People from Saint Paul, Minnesota
Presidents of the American Statistical Association
Presidents of the Institute of Mathematical Statistics
Members of the United States National Academy of Sciences
American people of Russian-Jewish descent
Stanford University Department of Statistics faculty
Mathematical statisticians
Computational statisticians